Tanoh Kpassagnon (born June 14, 1994) is an American football defensive end for the New Orleans Saints of the National Football League (NFL). He played college football at Villanova and was drafted by the Kansas City Chiefs in the second round of the 2017 NFL Draft.

High school career
Kpassagnon attended and played high school football at Wissahickon High School in Ambler, Pennsylvania. He was recently inducted into the Wissahickon High School Alumni Hall of Fame.

College career
Kpassagnon committed to play at Villanova University, the only school to offer him a scholarship for football. He redshirted his freshman season and started as a tight end. By his junior season, he had switched to defensive end. As a senior, he was the CAA defensive player of the year after recording 11 sacks. In a game against Pittsburgh, Kpassagnon blocked a field goal and had two tackles for loss.

Kpassagnon double-majored in accounting and finance at Villanova. He interned at the accounting firm PricewaterhouseCoopers for two summers.

Professional career
Kpassagnon received an invitation to the Senior Bowl and made two combined tackles and a sack, helping the South clinch a 16–15 defeat over the North. He attended the NFL Combine and completed all of the combine and positional drills. He also participated at Villanova's Pro Day and ran positional drills for scouts and representatives. Representatives from 18 NFL teams, including six defensive line coaches, attended to scout Kpassagnon as the feature prospect, two Villanova teammates, and seven other players from smaller schools. Kpassagnon had private workouts and visits with ten NFL teams, that included the Dallas Cowboys, Detroit Lions, Carolina Panthers, Cincinnati Bengals, Atlanta Falcons, New England Patriots, Baltimore Ravens, Washington Redskins, New Orleans Saints, and Pittsburgh Steelers. NFL draft experts and analysts projected him to be drafted anywhere from the second to fourth round. He was ranked the 12th best defensive end in the draft by NFLDraftScout.com and the 13th best defensive end by ESPN.

Kansas City Chiefs

The Kansas City Chiefs selected Kpassagnon in the second round with the 59th overall pick in the 2017 NFL Draft. He was the seventh defensive end selected in the 2017 NFL Draft. On June 7, 2017, the Kansas City Chiefs signed Kpassagnon to a four-year, $4.32 million contract with $1.94 million guaranteed and a signing bonus of $1.32 million.

He competed with Rakeem Nuñez-Roches, Jarvis Jenkins, Allen Bailey, and David King throughout training camp for the vacant starting defensive end job left by the departure of Jaye Howard. After showing versatility and "freakish" athleticism throughout training camp and the preseason, head coach Andy Reid designated an edge rusher role for Kpassagnon that allows him to line up at multiple positions, including outside linebacker, defensive end, and defensive tackle. Kpassagnon was named the backup right outside linebacker behind Dee Ford with the usual starter, Tamba Hali, on the physically unable to perform list to begin the regular season.

Kpassagnon made his professional regular season debut during the Kansas City Chiefs' season-opening 42–27 victory over the New England Patriots. On December 31, 2017, with the division title and the fourth seed clinched, Chiefs head coach Andy Reid rested the majority of the teams starters, giving Kpassagnon the chance to make his first career start against the Denver Broncos. He finished with seven combined tackles and two sacks during the 27–24 victory.

On January 19, 2020 against the Tennessee Titans in the AFC Championship Game, Kpassagnon sacked quarterback Ryan Tannehill twice during the 35–24 win. The Chiefs eventually made it to Super Bowl LIV. The Chiefs succeeded in defeating the 49ers 31–20 to secure their first championship in 50 years.

In Week 16 of the 2020 season against the Atlanta Falcons, Kpassagnon tipped a potential game-tying field goal attempt by Younghoe Koo to seal a 17–14 win for the Chiefs. Overall, he finished the 2020 season with 28 total tackles, one sack, and three passes defensed.
In the AFC Championship against the Buffalo Bills, Kpassagnon recorded one sack on Josh Allen during the 38–24 win.

New Orleans Saints
Kpassagnon signed a two-year contract with the New Orleans Saints on March 29, 2021. He was placed on injured reserve on December 2, 2021.

On February 27, 2023, Kpassagnon signed a two-year contract extension with the Saints.

Personal life
Kpassagnon is the son of Ivorian and Ugandan parents. His mother, Winifred Wafwoyo, is a chemist, and his father, Patrice Kpassagnon Tagro, is an economist.

References

External links
Villanova Wildcats bio
Kansas City Chiefs bio

1994 births
Living people
Sportspeople from Kalamazoo, Michigan
Players of American football from Michigan
American football defensive ends
Villanova Wildcats football players
Kansas City Chiefs players
American people of Ivorian descent
American people of Ugandan descent
New Orleans Saints players